Bamboo is a settlement in The Saint Ann Parish, Jamaica. Its population as of a 1991 census was 3,732 inhabitants.

The Hill Top Juvenile Correctional Centre of the Department of Correctional Services, Jamaica is located in Bamboo.

Bamboo used to be known as Little Kent

References

Populated places in Saint Ann Parish